Pierre Galopin was a French military officer who came to international attention when he was captured by a group of Chadian rebels, led by Hissène Habré, on 4 August 1974 in the Tibesti mountains, in the middle of the Sahara desert.  He was tried by a "revolutionary tribunal", sentenced to death on 26 December 1974 and, on 4 April 1975, executed by hanging.

Commandant Galopin had been sent to the north of Chad to negotiate the release of Françoise Claustre, and his fellow hostages, by the French and Chadian governments.  However, it has been alleged that he had a second mission, which was to encourage dissent among the rebels, and it was for this, together with his involvement in the interrogation of captured rebels using torture, that he had been condemned.  The extent of Hissène Habré's involvement in his death is also disputed.  It has also been claimed that Galopin was a member of the Françafrique network, led by Jacques Foccart.

When he went on his final mission, Galopin was deputy to Camille Gourvenec, both as deputy commander of the Nomad and National Guard, and as deputy security adviser to the President of Chad, François Tombalbaye.  Galopin had spent most of his professional career in the Sahara Desert, first distinguishing himself with operations in Mauritania, and was in Chad during much of the period from independence in 1960 until his death.

His remains were returned to France after Idriss Déby came to power.

External links
 St Cyr message board (in French)
 "The death of Commandant Galopin, an update" by R. Buijenhuijs (in French

References
 Le Monde, 29 December 1984, article by Christian Millet

Galopin
Galopin
1975 deaths
Executed military personnel
French people executed abroad